The Turner Diagonal (map) is a short freeway in Kansas City, Kansas. It runs from Kansas Avenue northwest to State Avenue. It does not have a single numbered designation, though the entire route was formerly signed as US 40 west of I-70, K-132 east of I-70 and is currently signed as K-32 from Kansas Avenue to its first interchange.

It is named "Turner Diagonal" because it runs diagonally and because it runs into and out of the Turner neighborhood in Kansas City. It provides a convenient shortcut to I-635, bypassing the stoplights on State Avenue and Parallel Parkway. The freeway was formerly known as K-132.

K-132
K-132 was a highway commissioned in the 1960s to connect Kansas City, KS to its Turner and Argentine neighborhoods. Its western terminus was originally at K-32, but was extended to terminate at I-70 in the late 1970s when the U.S. Route 40 alignment shifted to overlap I-70 after leaving the Turner Diagonal. Its eastern terminus at U.S. Route 69 (18th Street Expressway) in industrial Kansas City, KS.

It was turned back to the city of Kansas City in 1993, since all of the highway lay within the city limits. It was resigned as a realignment of K-32 east of Kaw Drive to US-69, while the controlled access portion west of Kaw Drive to I-70 remains unsigned. The state still maintains the roadway by repainting/replacing old exit signs; it has not maintained nor resurfaced this old segment of K-132 since 1993.

It is now simply known as "Turner Diagonal". The  portion of this expressway from I-70 west to US-24 was signed as US-40 until 2009. US-40 used to leave its concurrency with US-24, head east on the Turner Diagonal before overlapping I-70.

Exit list

References

External links

Kansas Department of Transportation State Map
KDOT: Historic State Maps

Transportation in Kansas City, Kansas
Transportation in Wyandotte County, Kansas
Roads in Kansas
Transportation in the Kansas City metropolitan area